Lee Sun-bin is a Korean name consisting of the family name Lee and the given name Sun-bin, and may also refer to:

 Lee Sun-bin (figure skater) (born 1986), South Korean figure skater
 Lee Sun-bin (actress) (born 1994), South Korean actress